Olga Umaralieva (born February 5, 1988) is an Uzbekistani sprint canoeist. She competed at the 2016 Summer Olympics in the women's K-1 200 metres event but did not advance past the heats.

References

1988 births
Living people
Uzbekistani female canoeists
Olympic canoeists of Uzbekistan
Canoeists at the 2016 Summer Olympics
Canoeists at the 2014 Asian Games
Canoeists at the 2018 Asian Games
Asian Games competitors for Uzbekistan
21st-century Uzbekistani women